The Scouts de Uruguay (SDU, Scouts of Uruguay) is one of Uruguay's Scouting organizations. It seceded from the Movimiento Scout del Uruguay in 2000 and serves about 900 members.

The Scout emblem of the Scouts de Uruguay incorporates elements of the coat of arms of Uruguay as well as the flag of Uruguay.

See also
 Scouting in Uruguay

External links
 Official SDU Homepage

Scouting and Guiding in Uruguay